Para Ti Con Desprecio (Spanish: For You, With Disregard) is the third studio album by Mexican rock band Panda, released on 11 May 2005 through Movic and Warner Records, marking their major-label debut.

Produced by Adrian Treviño, the album marked a major departure from the band's already established humorous pop punk style that had launched the band into domestic success.

Following its release, the band came under fire from the media and general public due to plagiarism accusations, claiming some of the old and new songs contained lyrics, bass riffs and guitar parts that belonged to songs from other mainstream rock acts such as MxPx, Smashing Pumpkins, Green Day, Alkaline Trio, Fall Out Boy and many others, since their debut album. The track "Miedo A Las Alturas" also generated discussion, with its verse and chorus being a literal translation and paraphrasing of the song "It's Not A Fashion Statement, It's A Deathwish" by American rock band My Chemical Romance. Further controversy surrounding the album circled around their radical image and sound change, to the point of being lumped and pigeonholed under the rising emo label.

Despite the controversies, the album was released to critical acclaim by Latin American music critics and newcomer fans, reaching top 5 and top 10 in Mexican music charts. It was a moderate commercial success and catapulted the band into mainstream success, especially in the United States and European countries, where the band had been previously unable to reach. The album's logo that was used in the album artwork also became a precursor to the band's iconic "PXNDX" logo that would be used in every single one of their follow-up albums.

Composition and lyrics
The band drastically evolved out of the silly, simplistic teenage pop punk formula, while experimenting with different tunes and arrangements. The content on the record is immensely heavier and darker than the first two albums; widely considered emo, alternative rock, pop punk with scenic goth-pop, and post-hardcore. The album's primarily theme is narrated over feelings of revenge, and sadness after an intense relationship and 
betrayal, heavily inspired in vocalist Madero's personal life (who had recently cut ties with his significant other, at the moment).

"During the early days crafting the album we where writing songs just for the sake to write them. We had something like 'Don't Blame Me For Being Cute' [No Me Culpes Por Ser Tan Bello], so stupid; and after opening concerts for Blink-182 in Mexico, something went really wrong with the girl who was my fiancée. I wanted retribution, but I wasn't planning on throwing eggs to her house or kidnapping her brother. That's when I said I'll make a record to let everyone know what a shit of a person you are', and It seemed like a great idea to me", said Madero during an interview.

Madero and bandmates had already written material for their next effort but rejected everything and re-wrote it all over again.

Track listing

 Personnel 
Adapted from Para Ti Con Desprecio'''s liner notes.Panda José Madero – vocals, guitar
 Ricardo Treviño – bass, choirs, guttural vocals
 Jorge Vázquez – drums
 Arturo Arredondo – guitar, choirsProductionAdrián "Rojo" Treviño – producer, mixer
Francisco “Kiko” Lobo de la Garza – executive producer
Ruly Videgaray – recording assistant
Lalo Nuñez – recording assistant
Garvin Lurssen – mastering engineer
Gerardo García – studio tech
Beto Ramos – drum tech
Mario Videgaray – art direction, designSession musicians'''
Marcelo Treviño – keyboards (track 8), strings arrangement (track 15)
Fernando Salinas – piano (track 5)
Marcelo Madero – spoken voice (track 9)
Alfonso Herrera – choirs

Certifications

References 

2005 albums
Panda (band) albums